Polyarthron pectinicorne is a species of beetle in the family Cerambycidae.

Subspecies
The following subspecies are recognised:
 Polyarthron pectinicorne desvauxi Fairmaire, 1868
 Polyarthron pectinicorne fairmairei Pic, 1893
 Polyarthron pectinicorne jolyi Pic, 1895
 Polyarthron pectinicorne pectinicorne (Fabricius, 1792)

Description
 in females. Thorax and elytra may be pale or dark brown. Elytra show three costae. Mandibles are quite long. Antennae are longer in males than in females. They are composed by 47 articles.

These beetles feed on Phoenix dactylifera. Larvae feed on roots. Adults can be seen from July to September.

Distribution
This species is present in North Africa (Algeria, Mauritania, Senegal, Libya, Tchad, Niger and Tunisia).

References

Prioninae
Beetles described in 1793